And Five Were Foolish is a 1924 collection of short stories by the English author Dornford Yates (Cecil William Mercer), first published in The Windsor Magazine. The title is a reference to the Parable of the Ten Virgins.

Plot 
The book consists of ten short stories, several of which were inspired by incidents and places known to Mercer. The title of each is the name of a significant female character.

Background 
The stories were written for The Windsor Magazine, whose readers had been clamouring for more.

Chapters

Critical reception 
The collected volume was a significant success, and was reprinted seven times before the coming of war in 1939.

The original dustjacket had the following quote -

 The Daily Telegraph - "The reader may decide for himself which five of Mr. Dornford Yates's virgins were foolish. Opinions will probably vary, and perhaps not one of the host of readers which the book deserves will compile a list tallying exactly with that which the author has drawn up in his own mind. But there will at least be unanimity on the point that here are ten extraordinary powerful and intriguing stories."

References

Bibliography
 

1924 short story collections
Ward, Lock & Co. books
Short story collections by Dornford Yates